Agaramangudi is a village in the Papanasam taluk of Thanjavur district, Tamil Nadu, India.

Demographics 

As per the 2001 census, Agaramangudi had a total population of 2300 with 1171 males and 1260 females. The sex ratio was 950. The literacy rate was 72.5. Compared to the beginning of 2001, the people there are well educated and well off. 90% of the people here are literate. 95% of the population is still dependent on agriculture. It is also one of the gradually rising villages. The areas are set up separately so that the people of the respective communities live separately. Some of the people here hold important high positions in government service. Many varieties of crops such as coconut and banana are cultivated throughout the year and are part of the trilogy. The annual festivals are celebrated in a special way without any competitive jealousy. It is one of the villages most affected by urbanization.

References 

 

Villages in Thanjavur district